Samantha Lam Tzi-sum (born June 29, 1978, in Vancouver, British Columbia) is a Chinese-Canadian equestrian. She competed for Hong Kong at the 2008 Summer Olympics.

References

External links
Official 2008 Beijing Games Page

1978 births
Canadian female equestrians
Canadian people of Hong Kong descent
Olympic equestrians of Hong Kong
Hong Kong female equestrians
Equestrians at the 2008 Summer Olympics
Sportspeople from Vancouver
Living people
Asian Games medalists in equestrian
Equestrians at the 2010 Asian Games
Equestrians at the 2014 Asian Games
Canadian emigrants to Hong Kong
Asian Games bronze medalists for Hong Kong
Medalists at the 2010 Asian Games